is a mountain in Hokkaidō. It is located on the border between Date and Shiraoi in Hokkaidō, Japan. It is the tallest mountain in the Iburi subprefecture. From the top you can see Lake Tōya, Lake Shikotsu, Mount Yōtei, Mount Eniwa, and even the outskirts of Sapporo.

References

External links
 Geographical Survey Institute

Horohoro